Agency may refer to:

Organizations
 Institution, governmental or others
 Advertising agency or marketing agency, a service business dedicated to creating, planning and handling advertising for its clients
 Employment agency, a business that serves as a representative, acting on behalf of another
 Government agency, a department of a local or national government responsible for the oversight and administration of a specific function
 Central Intelligence Agency, nicknamed "The Agency"
 International agency, an inter-governmental body

 News agency
 Talent agency

Social science
 Agency, the abstract principle that autonomous beings, agents, are capable of acting by themselves; see Autonomy
 Agency (law), a person acting on behalf of another person
 Agency (moral), capacity for making moral judgments
 Agency (philosophy), the capacity of an autonomous agent to act, relating to action theory in philosophy
 Agency (psychology), the ability to recognize or attribute agency in humans and non-human animals
 Agency (sociology), the ability of social actors to make independent choices, relating to action theory in sociology
 Agency and structure, ability of an individual to organize future situations and resource distribution

Places
 Agency (administrative division)
 Agency, Iowa, US
 Agency, Missouri, US
 Agency, Montana, US
 Agency Township (disambiguation), name of townships in four US states

Arts, entertainment and media
 Agency (novel), a science fiction novel by William Gibson
 The Agency (comics)
 The Agency: Covert Ops, a spy-themed massively multiplayer online shooter video game

Film and television
 The Agency (film), a 1980 Canadian film starring Lee Majors
 The Agency (2001 TV series), an American action-drama
 The Agency (2007 TV series), an American reality series
 Morgana Robinson's The Agency, a 2016 British TV mockumentary
 The Agency, a fictional government organization in the 2000 TV series The Invisible Man
 Agency (South Korean TV series), a 2023 television series

Other uses
 Agency in Mormonism, "the privilege of choice... introduced by God"
 Agency security, securities issued by government-sponsored enterprises, often simply referred to as "Agency"

See also
 Agent (disambiguation)
 Free agency (disambiguation)
 Agency dilemma or principal–agent problem, in political science, supply chain management and economics